Akrotiri is a village on the island of Santorini in Greece. It is located 15 kilometers south of the capital Fira, built on the slopes of a hill offering staggering views of the caldera cliffs. On top of this hill, there are remains of a Venetian castle (Goulas). 
Akrotiri is part of the Thira region and had 489 permanent inhabitants according to the Greek census of 2011.

Approximately 2 km southeast, the Minoan Bronze Age Akrotiri archaeological site is located. This is one of the most important of its kind in the Aegean.

West of Akrotiri and on Santorini's westmost tip, there is a lighthouse dating from 1892. Much of the town is built around the ruins of a 13th-century fortress, the Castle of Akrotiri.

Gallery

See also
Akrotiri (prehistoric city)

References

Santorini
Populated places in Thira (regional unit)